Haras El Hodood Sporting Club, is an Egyptian professional sports club based in El Max, Alexandria. It is best known for its professional football team, that competes in the Egyptian Premier League.

History
Haras El Hodood were founded in 1932 under the name of El-Sawahel Social Sporting Club, before being renamed to its current name on 16 July 1974.

They were at first place after 14 matches in the 2011–12 Egyptian Premier League, before the season was cancelled due to the Port Said Stadium disaster. In the 2019–20 Egyptian Premier League season, Haras El Hodood finished 16th to be relegated to the Egyptian Second Division, the second tier of the Egyptian football league system.

Crest

Honours
 Egyptian Second Division
Winners (1): 2017–18 (Group C).
 Egypt Cup
Winners (2): 2008–09, 2009–10.
 Egyptian Super Cup
Winners (1): 2009.

Performance in CAF competitions
PR = Preliminary round
FR = First round
SR = Second round
PO = Play-off round

Current squad
As of 4 February, 2023.

Managers
 Helmy Toulan (July 1, 2002 – June 30, 2006)
 Tarek El Ashry (July 1, 2006 – May 23, 2012)
 Helmy Toulan (July 1, 2012 – July 6, 2013)
 Abu-Taleb Al-Essawy (July 21, 2013 – Feb 3, 2014)
 Abdul Hamid Bassiouny (Feb 3, 2014 – Dec 2015)
 Ahmed Ayoub (Dec 2015 – 2016)
 Tarek El Ashry (Sep 18, 2018 – Feb 20, 2020)
 Mohamed Halim (Feb 20, 2020 – Sep 15, 2020)
 Tarek El Ashry (Sep 15, 2020 – Oct 9, 2020)
 Mohamed Halim (Oct 9, 2020 – present)

External links
Team profile – EFA Official website

Football clubs in Alexandria
Association football clubs established in 1932
1932 establishments in Egypt